Arthur Franklin Williams (August 26, 1877 – May 16, 1941) was a first baseman/right fielder who played briefly for the Chicago Orphans during the  season. Williams batted left-handed and threw right-handed. A native of Somerville, Massachusetts, he attended Tufts University. 
 
In one season career, Williams was a .231 hitter (37-for-160) with 17 runs and 14 RBI in 47 games, including three doubles and nine stolen bases without home runs.

Williams died in Arlington, Virginia, at the age of 63.

External links
Baseball Reference
Retrosheet

 

Chicago Orphans players
Major League Baseball first basemen
Major League Baseball right fielders
Tufts University alumni
Baseball players from Massachusetts
1877 births
1941 deaths
San Francisco (minor league baseball) players
Beloit (minor league baseball) players
Chapman (minor league baseball) players